Ithu Nammude Katha is a 2011 Indian Malayalam-language film written and directed by Rajesh Kannankara, who debuts with this film. It stars Asif Ali, Nishan, Abhishek, Vineeth Kumar, Ananya, Amala Paul and Nimisha in the lead roles. The film is a remake of 2009 Tamil film Nadodigal with story credited to Samuthirakani. The story revolves around a girl with lot of problems. She enters the life of a group of three youngsters. The film released on 28 January 2011.

Plot
Vinod, Santhosh and Kochumon are best friends who always hang out together. Vinod is betrothed to his cousin, Kalyani but her father is stubborn that he will only let him marry her if he has a government job. Santhosh is secretly in love with Vinod's sister, Ammu and Vinod is aware of their relation even though he turns a blind eye towards it. 
One day, Mahesh, Vinod's friend, comes to their village. The trio saves him from committing suicide and asks him why he tried to kill himself. Mahesh tells them that he is in love with a girl named Aishwarya, who is the daughter of his mother's political rival and realizing that both the families won't agree to their marriage, his only way was to die as he can't live without Aishwarya. The trio agrees to help Mahesh elope with Aishwarya. They safely saves the couple from the attacks of their families and bids them goodbye asking them to live their life happily. But in the fight, Santhosh loses his leg and Kochumon his hearing ability and Vinod loses his grandmother in an ambush from Aishwarya's family.  As the families file a case against the three of them, they become a burden to even their families. Kalyani is forced to marry a government employee, breaking Vinod's heart. Vinod supports Ammu's relation with Santhosh in front of their parents. Months later, while they are attending the trial of the case in the court, they are informed that the case is closed. They realise that Mahesh and Aishwarya got separated and moved back to their respective houses. They try to meet both of them, but are restricted by their parents, forcing them to kidnap both of them. They are angry towards the both of them because they have sacrificed their own life to unite them, only for them to get separated after few weeks. They leave the place and deciding to rebuild their life once again from scratch and on their way back, they hear another trio talking about helping their friend elope with his girlfriend.

Cast

Asif Ali as Vinod Kumar
Nishan as Santhosh George
Abhishek Raveendran as Sainulabdeen / Kochumon
Vineeth Kumar as Mahesh
Ananya as Kalyani
Amala Paul as Aishwarya
Nimisha Suresh as Ammu
Kottayam Nazeer as "Chenkal Choola" Babu
Suraj Venjaramoodu as Tintumon / Bapootty
Lalu Alex as George Kutty
Jagathy Sreekumar as Sarkar Pillai
Indrans as Kunju Muhammad
Devan as Vijayarakhavan
Kaviyoor Ponnamma as Saraswathy
Shobha Mohan as Saudhamini
Ambika Mohan as Ramani
Jagadheesh as Satheesh
Kalaranjini as Sethulekshmi
 Balachandran Chullikadu as Advocate

ProductionPooja of the film was held in Kochi in July 2010. Ithu Nammude Katha began its filming in August 2010 in Kavalam near Changanassery. In addition to Kavalam, the locations for the film include Kuttanadu, Pollachi and Gundalpettu. The film features an ensemble cast consisting of many new faces. According to the director, they are planning to include all the new faces of Malayalam cinema, perhaps in cameo roles or as part of a song sequence. The lead male roles have been played by Asif Ali, Nishan and  Abhishek, who previously teamed up in Apoorvaragam and the former two also in Ritu. There are 3 female leads in the film played by Ananya, Nimisha and Amala Paul. Ananya's previous films were Nadodigal, on which the film is based on, Shikkar and Kandahar, Nimisha has done significant roles in Pachakuthira and Mayavi'' whereas Amala Paul is an upcoming star in films.

Soundtrack 
The songs were composed by Mohan Sithara and Sundar C. Babu.
"Olakili Kuzhaloothi" - Madhu Balakrishnan, Shweta Mohan
"Pathiye Sandhya" - Najim Irshad
"Anuragham Mannil" - Shankar Mahadevan
"Karayanvendiyano" -  Divya Venugopal

Reception
The film received moderately positive reviews from critics. But it ended up as a box office disaster mainly due to lack of publicity.

See also
Naadodigal
Shambo Shiva Shambo
Hudugaru

References

External links
 

2011 films
Malayalam remakes of Tamil films
2010s Malayalam-language films
2011 romance films
Indian romance films
Changanassery
Films shot in Kerala
Films shot in Alappuzha
Films shot in Pollachi